"I Know Somebody" is a song recorded by American country music duo LoCash (formerly LoCash Cowboys). It was released to radio on February 22, 2016 as the second single from The Fighters. The song was written by Rhett Akins, Ross Copperman and Jeremy Stover. "I Know Somebody" reached number one on the Billboard Country Airplay chart, giving LoCash their first number-one country hit. It also peaked at numbers 4 and 52 on both the Hot Country Songs and Hot 100 charts respectively. The song was certified Gold by the Recording Industry Association of America (RIAA), and has sold 174,000 copies in that country as of November 2016. It received similar chart success in Canada, reaching number 8 on the Canada Country chart and number 94 on the Canadian Hot 100.

A music video directed by Ry & Drew Cox was created to promote the single.

Critical reception 
Billy Dukes of Taste of Country reviewed the song favorably, saying that "A catchy chorus infuses “I Know Somebody” with a jolt of energy before the second verse brings the roller coaster ride back down for a moment. There are a few non-organic instruments to be found, but this is a band that's long been comfortable stretching the definition of country music. Asking LoCash to rely on banjo and fiddle would be like asking George Strait to wear skinny jeans."

Music video
The music video was directed by Ry & Drew Cox and premiered in June 2016.

Chart performance 
The song has sold 174,000 copies in the US as of November 2016.

Year end charts

Certifications

References 

2015 songs
2016 singles
LoCash songs
Songs written by Ross Copperman
Songs written by Jeremy Stover
Songs written by Rhett Akins